Carl Erik "Inge" Heijbroek (12 October 1915 – 9 February 1956) was a Dutch field hockey player who competed in the 1936 Summer Olympics.

He was born in Hilversum and died in Dublin, Ireland

Heijbroek was a member of the Dutch field hockey team, which won the bronze medal. He played one match as forward.

External links
 
profile

1915 births
1956 deaths
Dutch male field hockey players
Olympic field hockey players of the Netherlands
Field hockey players at the 1936 Summer Olympics
Olympic bronze medalists for the Netherlands
Olympic medalists in field hockey
Sportspeople from Hilversum
Medalists at the 1936 Summer Olympics
20th-century Dutch people